The Tramweg Onderneming Gouda-Bodegraven was a  gauge steam tram that operated over an  line between Gouda and Bodegraven in the Netherlands. The line was also known as "Stoomtramweg Maatschappij Gouda", then "Algemeene Tramweg Maatschappij", and eventually part of "M.E.T" ("Maatschappij tot Exploitatie van Tramwegen"). The line opened in 1881 and closed in 1917.

See also 
Narrow-gauge railways in the Netherlands

References 

750 mm gauge railways in the Netherlands
Steam trams in the Netherlands